(976–1003) was the progenitor of the Sasaki clan, having taken the name from his domain in Ōmi Province. He was the great-grandson of Minamoto no Masanobu, progenitor of the Uda Genji.

Family
 Father: Minamoto no Sukenori (951–998)
 Mother: Fujiwara no Yukinari’s daughter
 Wife: Kanno Atsuyori's daughter-Wet-nurse of Emperor Suzaku
 Children:
 Sasaki no Yoshitsune (1000-1058) by Kanno Atsuyori's daughter
 Minamoto no Muneyori
 Minamoto no Noritsuna

References
Papinot, Edmond (1910). Historical and geographical dictionary of Japan. Tokyo: Librarie Sansaisha.

See also
 Uda Genji
 Sasaki clan
 Rokkaku clan
 Kyōgoku clan

Daimyo